Canadian Strain is a 2019 Canadian comedy film, directed by Geordie Sabbagh. The film stars Jess Salgueiro as Anne Banting, a drug dealer whose livelihood is disrupted by the 2018 legalization of cannabis in Canada.

The film's cast also includes Thom Allison, Benjamin Ayres, Natalie Brown, Colin Mochrie, Ashleigh Rains, Naomi Snieckus and Maria Vacratsis.

Production on the film commenced in August 2018.

The film premiered at the Whistler Film Festival on December 7, 2019. It was slated to premiere commercially on March 20, 2020, but following the closure of public venues due to the COVID-19 pandemic, the producers shifted to online distribution, releasing the film on the Apple TV platform on March 17.

Cast 

 Jess Salgueiro as Anne Banting
 Benjamin Ayres as Luke
 Colin Mochrie as Jack Banting
 Maria Vacratsis as Barbara Banting
 Naomi Snieckus as Judy
 Natalie Brown as Valerie
 Thom Allison as Gary

References

External links
 

2019 films
2019 comedy films
Canadian comedy films
English-language Canadian films
Canadian films about cannabis
2010s English-language films
2010s Canadian films